Mike Varney is an American record producer and music publisher. He is the founder of the Shrapnel Label Group, which includes Shrapnel Records, Tone Center Records, and Blues Bureau International. He also owns 50% of Magna Carta Records, a New York-based label. Varney is often credited for popularizing the mid-1980s shred guitar boom, and has continuously specialized in producing musicians within the genres of instrumental rock, hard rock, jazz, jazz fusion, blues, blues-rock, progressive metal, and speed metal.

Early life 
Mike Varney grew up in Novato, California, in the San Francisco Bay Area.  Before forming Shrapnel Records, Varney played extensively with the pre-punk band, The Nuns.  The Nuns were one of the most successful bands in the Bay Area at that time, regularly selling out at the local venues and clubs. He co-wrote and performed "Rock Justice" along with Jefferson Airplane and Jefferson Starship's Marty Balin, released by EMI in 1980. Varney also led his band, Cinema, which received wide recognition in the San Francisco Bay Area. He was known for searing lead guitar runs performed on his collection of Gibson SG guitars.

Career

Shrapnel Records 
Shrapnel Records was founded in 1980 by Mike Varney at the age of 22. It was the first record company in the USA strictly dedicated to heavy metal. Shrapnel was at the forefront of the neo-classical electric guitar and shred movements. Shrapnel Records was the first label to bring guitarists to world attention such as Yngwie Malmsteen (Steeler), Marty Friedman, Jason Becker, Paul Gilbert, Racer X, Tony MacAlpine, Vinnie Moore, Greg Howe, Richie Kotzen, John5 and many others. Today Shrapnel continues to record guitarists and has also returned to his metal roots by releasing some classic metal and hard rock records due to a resurgence in interest.

Guitar Player Magazine's Spotlight column 
Mike Varney began his "Spotlight" column in Guitar Player magazine in 1982 as a vehicle for discovering talent among the magazine's audience. His monthly column featured many so-called hometown heroes who sent in demos to showcase their abilities. Several players who were featured received opportunities to record with Shrapnel Records.

Blues Bureau International 
Blues Bureau International, founded in 1991, is a label that has focused its attention on the blues-rock genre. Through the years the label has recorded many artists including Pat Travers, Rick Derringer, Eric Gales, Scott Henderson's solo records as well as records from his group "Tribal Tech", Glenn Hughes, Marc Ford,Chris Duarte, Neal Schon, The Outlaws, Joe Louis Walker, etc. The label continues to record artists in the electric blues style.

Tone Center 
Tone Center Records, founded in 1997, is an independent record company owned by Varney, dedicated to recording high-level, jazz, jazz/rock and fusion music. The roster is made up of some of the most well-known names in the instrumental jazz/rock/fusion world. The labels records include performances by Frank Gambale, Eric Johnson, Warren Haynes, Steve Morse, Victor Wooten and Mike Stern.

Partial list of artists who have appeared on releases on Varney's record labels

Shrapnel Records 
Source:

 Apocrypha
 Artension
 Brides of Destruction
 Cacophony
 Chastain
 Craig Goldy
 Deen Castronovo
 Derek Taylor
 George Lynch
 Glenn Hughes
 Great White
 Greg Howe
 Haji's Kitchen
 Jake E. Lee
 James Murphy
 Jason Becker
 Jeff Watson
 Jizzy Pearl
 Joey Tafolla
 John5
 Johnny Hiland
 John West
 L.A. Guns
 Marc Rizzo
 Marty Friedman
 Michael Lee Firkins
 Michael Schenker Group
 Michelle Meldrum
 Nicole Couch
 Paul Gilbert
 Racer X
 Richie Kotzen
 Timelord
 Tony Fredianelli
 Tony MacAlpine
 UFO
 Vicious Rumors
 Vinnie Moore
 Vitalij Kuprij
 War & Peace
 Winger
 Yngwie Malmsteen

Tone Center Records 
Source:

 Adam Rogers
 Anthony Jackson
 Bill Connors
 Bill Frisell
 Bireli Lagrene
 Brett Garsed
 Chris Duarte
 Craig Erickson
 Dennis Chambers
 Eric Johnson
 Frank Gambale
 Gary Willis
 Jack DeJohnette
 Jimmy Haslip
 Jimmy Herring
 John Abercrombie
 John Patitucci
 John Scofield
 Kai Eckhardt
 Larry Coryell
 Mike Stern
 OHM
 Pat Martino
 Rob Wasserman
 Robben Ford
 Ron Keel
 Scott Henderson
 Scott Kinsey
 Simon Phillips
 Steve Bailey
 Steve Khan
 Steve Lukather
 Steve Marcus
 Steve Morse
 Steve Smith
 Stuart Hamm
 TJ Helmerich
 T Lavitz
 Tom Coster
 Victor Wooten
 Vinnie Colaiuta
 Walter Trout
 Warren Haynes

Blues Bureau Records 
Source:

 Blindside Blues Band
 Chris Cobb
 Craig Erickson
 Eric Gales
 Glenn Hughes
 Joe Louis Walker
 Johnny Nitro
 Jon Butcher
 Leslie West
 Marc Ford
 Neal Schon
 Pat Travers
 Paul Gilbert
 Richie Kotzen
 Rick Derringer
 Scott Henderson
 The Outlaws
 Tony Spinner

Magna Carta Records 
Source:

 Age of Nemesis
 Alex Skolnick
 Andy West
 Billy Sheehan
 Bozzio Levin Stevens
 Caliban
 Clinton Administration
 David Lee Roth
 Derek Sherinian
 Doug Pinnick
 Enchant
 Ethan Brosh
 Explorers Club
 Fareed Haque
 Ice Age
 James LaBrie
 Jordan Rudess
 Kansas
 Khallice
 Liquid Tension Experiment
 Liquid Trio Experiment
 Magellan
 Martone
 Michael Lee Firkins
 Mike Portnoy
 Niacin
 OHMphrey
 Ozric Tentacles
 Points North
 Robert Berry
 Robert Walter
 Royal Hunt
 Shadow Gallery
 Steve Morse
 Steve Stevens
 Stripsearch
 Tempest
 Terry Bozzio
 Tiles
 Tony Hymas
 Tony Levin
 World Trade

References

External links 
The Shrapnel Label Group
Shrapnel Records Official MySpace Site
Official site for Jason Becker
Magna Carta Records Website
Bernd Steidl interview, 1993

Record producers from California
Living people
People from Novato, California
Year of birth missing (living people)